Majwal is a village in the Kotli District of Azad Kashmir, Pakistan.  Neighbouring settlements include Bindian and Giran.

References

Populated places in Kotli District